Bente Clod (born 1946) is a Danish poet and prose writer, "an important author within the realist feminist movement of the 1970s". She is also a children's writer. She received the Ministry of Culture's children book prize (Denmark) (Kulturministeriets Børnebogspris) in 2002 for her books Englekraft, I vilden sky and Himmelfald. In 2009 she received the Danish Literature Prize for Women (Dansk Litteraturpris for Kvinder).

Works

Articles, poems, prose 
 Det Autoriserede danske samleje og andre nærkampe [The Authorized Danish Sexual Intercourse and other melees], 1975

Novels 
 Brud (Break Ups), 1977
 Syv sind [In Two Minds], 1980
 Vent til du hører mig le [Wait till you Hear me Laugh], 1983

Poetry 
 Imellem os [Between Us], 1981
 Gul engel [Yellow Angel], 1990

Children's books 
 Englekraft [Angel power], 2001
 I vilden sky [In the wild cloud], 2001
 Himmelfald [Skyfall], 2002

References

External links
Author's website
Famous GLTB – Bente Clod

1946 births
Living people
Danish women poets
20th-century Danish novelists
Danish essayists
Danish feminists
Danish women novelists
Danish women essayists
20th-century Danish poets
20th-century essayists
20th-century Danish women writers